The Warlocks is the debut EP by American neo-psychedelic rock band the Warlocks, released in 2000 by record label Bomp!.

Reception 

AllMusic called the EP "wholly brilliant".

Track listing

"Cocaine Blues"
"Song for Nico"
"Jam of the Zombies"
"Caveman Rock"
"Angry Demons"
"Jam of the Warlocks"

References

External links 
 

2000 debut EPs
The Warlocks albums